Von Höpken is a family of Swedish nobility of English origin ("Hoepking"). It is matriculated into Swedish House of Nobility 1719 under number 1414. Daniel Niklas von Höpken was raised in the stand of Friherre, and
matriculated 1720 under number 161. Bogesund Castle later belonged to this Baronial branch. One of Daniel Niklas' sons was Count Anders Johan von Höpken.

External links
Von Höpken nr 1414 - Gustaf Elgenstierna, Den introducerade svenska adelns ättartavlor. 1925-36.

Swedish noble families
European families of English ancestry